"Superbad" is a song by the English dubstep producers Flux Pavilion and Doctor P. The song was released in the United Kingdom on 9 December 2011 for digital download. The single peaked at number 61 on the UK Singles Chart and number 7 on the UK Dance Chart.

Music video
A music video to accompany the release of "Superbad" was first released onto YouTube on 13 December 2011 at a total length of three minutes and forty-seven seconds.

Track listings

Chart performance

Release history

References 

2011 singles
Flux Pavilion songs
Warner Music Group singles